Haikou East railway station is a railway station on the Hainan eastern ring high-speed railway located at the south end of Longqun Road in Haikou, Hainan, China.

In 2018, the Haikou Transportation Center, the main bus station, relocated and is now directly to the south east of Haikou East Railway Station.

Gallery

External links
 

Railway stations in Hainan
Buildings and structures in Haikou